The 2018 Carlow Senior Football Championship is the 118th edition of the Carlow GAA's premier club gaelic football tournament for senior graded clubs in County Carlow, Ireland. The tournament consists of 8 teams, with the winner going on to represent Carlow in the Leinster Senior Club Football Championship. The championship starts with a group stage and then progresses to a knock out stage.

Éire Óg were the defending champions after they defeated Rathvilly in the previous years final.

This was the Kilbride's return to the senior grade after claiming the 2017 Carlow Intermediate Football Championship title, thus ending a 3-year exodus since being relegated in 2014. However, they were relegated straight back to the 2019 I.F.C. after losing their Relegation Playoff Final at the hands of Old Leighlin.

Team changes

The following teams have changed division since the 2017 championship season.

To S.F.C.
Promoted from 2017 Carlow Intermediate Football Championship
 Kilbride -  (Intermediate Champions)

From S.F.C.
Relegated to 2018 Carlow Intermediate Football Championship
O'Hanrahans

Group stage

There are two groups of four teams. The top two teams in each group compete in the semi-finals. The bottom team in each group compete in the relegation Final.

Group A

Round 1
 Éire Óg 2-15, 0-3 Mt. Leinster Rangers, 21/7/2018,
 St Andrew's 3-13, 0-9 Kilbride, 22/7/2018,

Round 2
 Éire Óg 0-18, 0-6 Kilbride, 4/8/2018,
 St Andrew's 1-13, 0-10 Mt. Leinster Rangers, 5/8/2018,

Round 3
 Mt. Leinster Rangers 0-13, 1-10 Kilbride, 25/8/2018,
 Éire Óg 4-12, 0-5 St Andrew's, 26/8/2018,

Group B

Round 1
 Tinryland 3-8, 0-14 Palatine, 21/7/2018, 
 Rathvilly 1-11, 1-9 Old Leighlin, 22/7/2018,

Round 2
 Rathvilly 1-7, 0-8 Tinryland, 4/8/2018, 
 Palatine 2-17, 0-3 Old Leighlin, 5/8/2018,

Round 3
 Palatine 2-10, 1-9 Rathvilly, 25/8/2018,
 Tinryland 1-11, 1-5 Old Leighlin, 25/8/2018,

Knock-out stages

Finals
The winners and runners up of each group qualify for the quarter finals.

Quarter-finals

Semi-finals

Final

Relegation play off

The bottom team in each group compete in the relegation final. The team to lose will be relegated to the 2019 I.F.C.

Relegation Final:
 Old Leighlin 3-6, 0-7 Kilbride, Ballynamire, 22/9/2018,

Leinster Senior Club Football Championship

References

 
 

Carlow Senior Football Championship
Carlow Senior Football Championship
Carlow SFC